Sennar is a city on the Blue Nile in Sudan and possibly the capital of the state of Sennar. It remains publicly unclear whether Sennar or Singa is the capital of Sennar State. For several centuries it was the capital of the Funj Kingdom of Sennar.

Overview
Sennar had an estimated population of 100,000 inhabitants in the early 19th century.

The city is home to Sinnar University, established in 1977.

Climate

Demographics

Notable people 
 Nasra bint ʿAdlan, Sudanese royalty

See also 
 Railway stations in Sudan

References

External links

Populated places in Sennar (state)
State capitals in Sudan